Branko Mihaljević Children's Theatre is a theatre located in Osijek, Croatia.

References 

Theatres in Osijek